Butterfly Collectors is a two part ITV miniseries. It was broadcast between 19 April and 20 April 1999. A two-part psychological thriller about a disillusioned policeman who develops an unlikely friendship with two teenagers arrested for murder. Butterfly Collectors was written by Paul Abbott, who has also written for many other television serials including Shameless, Clocking Off and Children's Ward. The drama stars British actor Pete Postlethwaite, who is supported by actress and comedian Crissy Rock.

In 2008, it was released on Region 1 DVD, on 4 September 2017, it was released by Strawberry Media on Region 2 DVD.

References

External links
 

1999 British television series debuts
1999 British television series endings
1990s British drama television series
1990s British crime television series
British thriller television series
1990s British television miniseries
Television shows set in Manchester
Television shows produced by Granada Television
ITV television dramas
Television series by ITV Studios
English-language television shows
Films shot in Greater Manchester